The International Council for Film, Television and Audiovisual Communication (ICFT) is the UNESCO advisory body on all matters concerned with film, television and new media. Located at UNESCO HQ's in Paris, France, was founded in UNESCO's 10th session of General Conference in 1956.

History
Under the chairmanship of Professor Paul Rivet, in 1955, UNESCO organized a series of consultations to further the work of the International Institute of Educational Cinema, which was previously affiliated to the League of Nations.

On the occasion of the General Conference of UNESCO, held in New Delhi in 1956, the project of establishing an International Institute of Cinema and Television was presented by Professor Mario Verdone, Head of the Italian Delegation, and approved. The study was entrusted to Jean Benoit-Levy, filmmaker, honorary director of the United Nations Cinema, assisted by a group of twelve international experts.

The Constitutional Charter of ICFT was signed on 23 October 1958. The most important federations and associations working in the field of audiovisuals and media became the founding members of the ICFT.

In 1980, with the emergence of new technologies, Professor Enrico Fulchignoni, Director of Artistic and Literary Creation at UNESCO and President of the ICFT, decided to add audiovisual communication to the missions of the counsel.

Since the creation of the ICFT, the presidency has been succeeded by: John Maddison (ISFA), Jean d'Arcy (RTF-UN), Raymond Ravar (CILECT), Mario Verdone (CIDALC), Fred Orain (Production), Enrico Fulchignoni (UNESCO), Gérard Bolla (UNESCO) Christopher Roads (British Library), Jean Rouch (CIFES), Daniel Van Espen (Signis), Pierpaolo Saporito (OCCAM), Jean-Michel Arnold (Camera), Hisanori Isomura (NHK) and Inoussa Ousseini (UNESCO).

Mission

The aim of the ICFT is to:
 stimulate the creation and promote the production and distribution of high standard audiovisual works;
 advise international organizations and States on the implementation of artistic, educational and industrial policies; 
 create a synergy among creators, professionals and media executives by developing collaboration within its members, especially in the service of the broad orientations of UNESCO; 
 set up an arena where different professionals in the field of audiovisual, especially the young people can present their views and suggestions to an international audience;
 encourage training and research in all audiovisual areas, including media education, and offer a space for reflection on the development of technologies in the service of creation, education and culture; 
 contribute to the efforts of development of communication, especially in the field of free flow of information.

The ICFT celebrated its 50th birthday at UNESCO on 23 October 2008.

Officers and Executive Committee

President 
Pierpaolo Saporito was chosen as ad interim president after the death of the former President of CICT-ICFT Inoussa Ousseini, Niger's ambassador to UNESCO and former Head of Niger's permanent delegation at UNESCO. Pierpaolo Saporito is also President of the Observatory on Digital Communication

Vice presidents
 Jean-Michel Arnold (France): past President of the ICFT, General Secretary of the Cinémathèque Française, President of CAMERA, and General Secretary of RIAVS 
 Serge Michel (France): representing UNICA 
 Daniel Van Espen (Belgium): past President of the ICFT, representing SIGNIS

Executive Member
 Jean Roy (France), President of International Federation of Film Critics

Director General
 Georges Dupont (Luxembourg), ORTF-TDF-INA-UNESCO

Secretary General
 Lola Poggi Goujon (Italy), former civil servant of UNESCO

Treasurer
 Annick Demeule (France), General Delegate of Rencontres internationales de l’audiovisuel scientifique (RIAVS)

Project Manager 
 Xueyuan HUN (China)

Executive committee
The executive committee is elected from member organisations and currently includes representatives of :

 ASIFA: International Animated Film Association
Ed Desroches, President

 CAMERA: Conseil Audiovisuel Mondial pour l'Édition et la Recherche sur l'Art
Jean-Michel Arnold, president

 CICAE: Confédération Internationale des Cinémas d'Art et d'Essai
Sylvie da Rocha, general secretary

 COPEAM: Conférence Permanente de l'Audiovisuel Méditerranéen
Emmanuel Hoog, president
Alessandra Paradisi, general secretary

 FIA: Fédération Internationale des Acteurs
Agnete Haaland, president
Dominick Luquer, general secretary

 OCCAM: Observatory on Digital Communication
Pierpaolo Saporito, President

 RIAVS Rencontres Internationales / Image et Science
Jean-Claude Carrière and Robert Silman, presidents
Jean-Michel Arnold and Annick Demeule, general secretaries

 SIGNIS: World Catholic Association for Communication
Alvito De Souza, general secretary
Daniel Van Espen, representing SIGNIS at the IFTC

 UNICA: Union Internationale du Cinéma
Max Hänsli, president
Jan Essing, general secretary
Serge Michel, representing UNICA at the IFTC

Manouj Kadaamh.

Activities
The principal role of the IFTC is to be the channel to and from UNESCO for all matters relating to film television audiovisual communication and the new media. This includes i) advising UNESCO on its "Creative Cities of Cinema" program, ii) participating in the planning of UNESCO programmes, iii) being closely associated with UNESCO's Division on "Freedom of Information" within the Culture and Communications sector, iv) carrying out surveys at UNESCO's request, etc.

It also organizes festivals (with the award "Prix du CICT"), workshops (e.g. for training the handicapped in audiovisual techniques) and adult education programs, as well as convening debates and meetings for specialists in education, science or culture.

References

External links
 The CICT-ICFT Site
 The UNESCO Site

UNESCO